The 1976 Davidson Wildcats football team represented Davidson College as a member of the Southern Conference during the 1976 NCAA Division I football season. Led by third-year head coach Ed Farrell, the Wildcats compiled an overall record of 2–6–1.

Schedule

References

Davidson
Davidson Wildcats football seasons
Davidson Wildcats football